2-Ethoxycarbonyl-1-methylvinyl cyclohexyl methylphosphonate is an extremely toxic organophosphate nerve agent. It is the cyclohexyl methylphosphonate ester of ethyl acetoacetate. The compound has two isomers, the cis isomer and trans isomer, with the trans isomer being more toxic.

See also
3,3,5-Trimethylcyclohexyl 3-pyridyl methylphosphonate
Mevinphos

References

Organophosphate nerve agents
Acetylcholinesterase inhibitors
Acetoacetate esters
Phosphonate esters
Ethyl esters
Cyclohexyl compounds